Ayoub Latrèche (born November 19, 1989) is an Algerian football player. He is currently playing for USM El Harrach in the Algerian Ligue Professionnelle 1.

Club career
Latrèche began his career in his hometown club of JSM Skikda. In December 2009, Latrèche signed an 18-month contract with MSP Batna. In June 2010, after just six months with the club, Latrèche left MSP Batna on a free transfer to join USM El Harrach, after not being paid his salary. He signed a two-year contract with the club.

Honours
 Finalist of the Algerian Cup once with USM El Harrach in 2011

References

External links
 DZFoot Profile
 

1989 births
Living people
Sportspeople from Skikda
Algerian footballers
Algerian Ligue Professionnelle 1 players
MSP Batna players
USM El Harrach players
Association football forwards
21st-century Algerian people